Robertsdale is a city in Baldwin County, Alabama, United States, which includes the community of Rosinton. At the 2020 census, the population was 6,708. It is part of the Daphne-Fairhope-Foley metropolitan area.

Geography
Robertsdale is located in southern Baldwin County at 30°33'16.034" North, 87°42'20.038" West (30.554454, -87.705566). U.S. Route 90 (Old Spanish Trail) passes through the city, leading west  to Mobile and east  to Pensacola, Florida.

Demographics

2020 Census data

As of the 2020 United States census, there were 6,708 people, 2,349 households, and 1,532 families residing in the city.

2010 Census data
As of the census of 2010, there were 5,276 people, 1,951 households, and 1,392 families residing in the city. The racial makeup of the city was 85.3% White, 5.4% Black or African American, 0.8% Native American, 0.5% Asian, 6.1% from other races, and 1.9% from two or more races. 9.2% of the population were Hispanic or Latino of any race.

There were 1,951 households, out of which 36.1% had children under the age of 18 living with them, 51.4% were married couples living together, 14.6% had a female householder with no husband present, and 28.7% were non-families. 23.7% of all households were made up of individuals, and 10.2% had someone living alone who was 65 years of age or older. The average household size was 2.64 and the average family size was 3.10.

In the city, the population was 27.3% under the age of 18, 9.0% from 18 to 24, 28.7% from 25 to 44, 20.9% from 45 to 64, and 14.2% who were 65 years of age or older. The median age was 33.8 years. For every 100 females, there were 89.7 males. For every 100 females age 18 and over, there were 93.9 males. The median income for a household in the city was $41,750, and the median income for a family was $47,253. Males had a median income of $41,822 versus $26,239 for females. The per capita income for the city was $20,696. About 8.1% of families and 10.1% of the population were below the poverty line, including 12.2% of those under age 18 and 9.7% of those age 65 or over.

Education 
Robertsdale is a part of the Baldwin County Public Schools system. Three elementary schools, a middle school, and a high school serve Robertsdale. A vocational school is also located in Robertsdale.

Schools

Public 

 Robertsdale High School (9-12)
 South Baldwin Center for Technology (11-12)
 Central Baldwin Middle School (7-8)
 Elsanor Elementary School (K-6)
 Robertsdale Elementary School (K-6)
 Rosinton Elementary School (K-6)

Private 
 Central Christian School (K-12)
 St. Patrick Catholic School (K3-8)

Events
The city of Robertsdale hosts the Baldwin County Fair every fall for at least four days.
The city of Robertsdale holds a parade every December 7.

Notable people
Obie Trotter, professional basketball player
Joe Childress, former NFL running back
Tim Cook, CEO of Apple Inc.

See also
 Central Baldwin

References

External links
City of Robertsdale official website

Cities in Alabama
Cities in Baldwin County, Alabama
Populated places established in 1905
1905 establishments in Alabama